Spencer Frederick James (born 15 April 1953) is an English singer and musician. He has been the lead singer of veteran pop band The Searchers since 1986. James was also a member of the one-hit wonder band The First Class that scored a No. 4 hit with the song "Beach Baby".

Career
James grew up in Hayes, Middlesex. Working for Marshall's Music Group, he developed an interest in guitars and began playing and singing in local bands. James improved his stage craft while deputising in the band White Plains. He then moved on to form a band named Duke.

The First Class

The First Class was initially a studio creation featuring the voice of Tony Burrows. The success of the song "Beach Baby" (#4 in the US) led to demand for live appearances. A group, including Spencer James, was assembled to perform a number of dates as The First Class (see Videography below).

In 1983, The First Class recorded the single "Gimme Little Sign" with Spencer James on vocals. The single had some success in the Netherlands.

Nightfly

Formed in 1985 (originally under the name Heyday), Nightfly was a supergroup consisting of Spencer James on lead vocals, Zak Starkey on drums, Boz Burrell (ex-Bad Company) on bass, Micky Moody (ex-Whitesnake) on guitar and Mickey Simmonds on keyboards. Nightfly toured in early 1985 but broke up soon after.

James went on to form the Spencer James Band which enjoyed considerable success around the pub circuit of West London. At one gig at Brentford's Red Lion they shared the bill with The Searchers.

The Searchers

In December 1985 long-time lead singer of The Searchers, Mike Pender, announced that he was leaving the group. Founding member John McNally recalled Spencer James from the Brentford gig and he was recruited as the new lead singer. His mastery of the synthesizer guitar also added authentic strings and keyboard sounds to The Searchers stage performances, emulating their original studio recordings.

For more than twenty years, James has completed extensive national and international tours with The Searchers. He has also contributed to the album Hungry Hearts and a number of live recordings of the band (see Discography).

Discography

Solo recordings
Despite his hectic schedule with The Searchers, James has found time to record a number of solo albums in his home studio (SJO Music), many of the songs written himself. He also records and produces other acts.
 Days Gone By (1987)
Tides of Time
Love Remains
Breathe In, Breathe Out (2004)
The Age of Reason (2011)
Hope For Me Yet (2012)
Chapter & Verse (2016)
Time For Letting Go (2018)

As lead singer for The Searchers
Hungry Hearts (1989)
Searchers Live (1998)
Searchers Live 2 (2000)
Searchers Live 3 (2003)
On Stage (2005)
The Definitive Searchers Live in Concert (2008)

Videography

References

External links

The Searchers website
The Searchers discography including James's releases

English pop guitarists
English male guitarists
English pop singers
English songwriters
Living people
People from Hayes, Hillingdon
1953 births
The Searchers (band) members
British male songwriters